Nowa Wieś Złotoryjska  is a village in the administrative district of Gmina Złotoryja, within Złotoryja County, Lower Silesian Voivodeship, in south-western Poland. 

References

Villages in Złotoryja County